Poë is a surname. Notable people with the surname include:

Edmund Poë (1849–1921), Irish-born British naval officer
Hutcheson Poë (1848–1934), Irish soldier and politician
Poë-Domvile baronets (2 generations, 1912–1959), an Irish baronetcy

See also
Poe (surname)